Wabash Cannonball is an LP record album produced in 1977 by the National Geographic Society. The album was part of a series of sound recordings called "An American adventure" which also included "Barbershop Days" (1977), "Song of the Cumberland Gap in the days of Daniel Boone" (1977), "Westward Ho!" (1977), and "In the good old summertime" (1979).

The music on Wabash Cannonball is principally American folk songs and popular music about railroads and trains.

Track listing

Side One
"Gandy Dancers' Medley (Lining Calls/Orange Blossom Special/She'll Be Comin' Round the Mountain)"
Orange Blossom Special: Ervin T. Rouse
"Drill, Ye Tarriers, Drill"
"John Henry"
"Nine Hundred Miles"
"Wandering"
Roger Bissell - String Quartet Arrangement
"Big Rock Candy Mountain"

Side Two
"Wabash Cannonball" (J. A. Roff)
"Casey Jones" (T. Lawrence Seibert)
Eddie Newton - Music
"Rock Island Line"
"Careless Love"
"Chattanooga Choo Choo" (Mack Gordon)
Harry Warren - Music
"City of New Orleans" (Steve Goodman)

Personnel
Note: Due to the various artists employed in the making of this album and the shift of artists between instruments and vocals, the credits for each track have been listed individually instead of providing a single summary.

"Lining Calls"
Terry McMillan

"Orange Blossom Special"
Lore – Lead Vocal
Pebble Daniel, Jack Grochmal, Bobby Harden, Jeff Tweel - Chorus
Terry McMillan - Harmonica
Hoot Hester - Fiddle
Randolph Hilman - Bass
Paul Franklin - Dobro
Jeff Tweel - Keyboard
Clay Caire - Percussion

"Drill, Ye Tarriers, Drill"
Lore - Vocal
John Pell - Guitar
Hoot Hester - Mandolin
Terry McMillan - Harmonica
Paul Franklin - Dobro
Clay Caire - Percussion

"John Henry"
Jeff Tweel - Vocal
Hoot Hester - Fiddle
Terry McMillan - Harmonica
Randolph Hilman - Bass
John Pell - Guitar
Paul Franklin - Dobro
Clay Caire - Percussion

"Nine Hundred Miles"
Jack Grochmal - Lead Vocal
Pebble Daniel, Bobby Harden, Jeff Tweel - Chorus
Jeff Tweel - Keyboard
John Pell - Guitar
Paul Franklin - Dobro
Randolph Hilman - Bass

"Wandering"
Jack Grochmal - Vocal
John Pell - Guitar
Terry McMillan - Harmonica
Sheldon Kurland and Carl Gorodetzky- Violin
Roy T. Christensen - Cello
Marvin D. Chantry - Viola
Bobby Taylor - Oboe
Hoot Hester - Mandolin

"Big Rock Candy Mountain"
Lore - Lead Vocal
Jack Grochmal, Randolph Hilman, Jeff Tweel, Johnnie Wright - Chorus
Hoot Hester - Fiddle
Terry McMillan - Harmonica
Randolph Hilman - Bass
Paul Franklin - Dobro
Clay Caire - Percussion

"Wabash Cannonball"
Lore - Vocal
Paul Franklin - Steel Guitar
Hoot Hester, John Pell - Guitar
Randolph Hilman - Bass
Jeff Tweel - Keyboard
Terry McMillan - Harmonica
Clay Caire - Percussion

"Casey Jones"
Lore - Lead Vocal
Jack Grochmal, Bobby Harden, Jeff Tweel - Chorus
Terry Bethel - Dobro
Hoot Hester - Mandolin
Randolph Hilman - Bass
Jeff Tweel - Keyboard
John Pell - Guitar
Terry McMillan - Harmonica

"Rock Island Line"
Jeff Tweel - Lead Vocal
Pebble Daniel, Bobby Harden, Hoot Hester, Terr McMillan - Chorus
Terry Bethel - Dobro

"Careless Love"
Lore - Lead Vocal
Pebble Daniel, Jeff Tweel - Chorus
John Pell - Guitar
Hoot Hester - Fiddle

"Chattanooga Choo Choo"
Lore - Lead Vocal
Tom Brannon, Bobby Harden, Alan Moore, E. Duane West - Chorus
Brenton Banks - Keyboard
Dalton Dillingham - Bass
John Pell - Guitar
Louis Brown, Don Sheffield, Denis Solee - Horns
Buddy Harman - Drums

"City of New Orleans"
Jack Grochmal - Lead Vocal
Pebble Daniel, Bobby Harden, Lore, Jeff Tweel - Chorus
Jeff Tweel - Keyboard
John Pell - Guitar
Hoot Hester - Mandolin and Fiddle
Terry McMillan - Harmonica
Paul Franklin - Dobro
Bobby Talyor - Oboe
Marvin D. Chantry, Roy T. Christensen, Carl Gorodetzky, Sheldon Kurland - Strings
Clay Caire - Percussion
Randolph Hilman - Bass

References

1977 compilation albums
Folk compilation albums